Ian Little (born 10 December 1973) is a former Scottish football player and current assistant manager of Bo'ness United.

Career
During his playing career, Little represented Berwick Rangers, Livingston, Stenhousemuir and Alloa Athletic.

Little had spells as manager of Vale of Leithen, Heriot Watt University, Livingston Under 20s, a brief caretaker role at Tranent Juniors, Whitehill Welfare, and Berwick Rangers.

Little was made caretaker manager of Berwick Rangers after Jimmy Crease left the club in October 2011. After some good results, Berwick announced in mid-November that Little would stay in charge until 31 December, when matters will be re-assessed. On 28 December 2011, Berwick Rangers announced that Little would remain as manager until at least the end of the 2011-12 season. On 17 March 2012, Berwick Rangers announced that Little would remain as manager at least until the end of the 2012-13 season. Berwick finished 4th in the 2012–13 Scottish Third Division, but lost to East Fife in the promotion/relegation play-offs. Little left Berwick in January 2014, with the club citing its lowly league position as the reason for making a managerial change.

After a spell as manager of Lowland League club Whitehill Welfare, Little returned to Berwick in May 2019 as assistant to John Brownlie, before returning to his role as manager a month later.

Berwick parted company with Little on 28 May 2021.

Little was appointed assistant manager of Bo'ness United in July 2022.

Managerial statistics

Honours

Player
Stenhousemuir
Scottish Challenge Cup 1995–96 

Alloa Athletic
Scottish Challenge Cup 1999–2000

References

1973 births
Alloa Athletic F.C. players
Association football midfielders
Berwick Rangers F.C. managers
Berwick Rangers F.C. players
Living people
Livingston F.C. players
Scottish Football League managers
Scottish Football League players
Scottish football managers
Scottish footballers
Scottish Professional Football League managers
Footballers from Edinburgh
Stenhousemuir F.C. players
Lowland Football League managers